The women's heptathlon event at the 2017 European Athletics U23 Championships was held in Bydgoszcz, Poland, at Zdzisław Krzyszkowiak Stadium on 13 and 14 July.

Medalists

Results

Final standings

References

Heptathlon
Combined events at the European Athletics U23 Championships